Rodger McHarg (born 29 March 1947) is a former New Zealand cricket umpire. He stood in three Test matches between 1986 and 1991 and 13 ODI games between 1986 and 1992.

See also
 List of Test cricket umpires
 List of One Day International cricket umpires

References

1947 births
Living people
People from Christchurch
New Zealand Test cricket umpires
New Zealand One Day International cricket umpires